Khasraj-e Mezban (also Romanized as Khasraj-e Mezbān and Khasraj-e-Mazbān; also known as Khasraj and Khasraj-e-Nazbān) is a village in Seyyed Abbas Rural District, Shavur District, Shush County, Khuzestan Province, Iran. At the 2006 census, its population was 405, in 64 families.

References 

Populated places in Shush County